No. 547 Squadron RAF was a Royal Air Force Squadron formed as an RAF Coastal Command anti-shipping and anti submarine squadron in World War II.

History

Formation in World War II
The squadron formed at RAF Holmsley South on 21 October 1942 and was equipped with Wellingtons,  it then operated Liberators and patrolled the Bay of Biscay. It later moved to RAF Leuchars, Scotland where it disbanded on 4 June 1945.

Aircraft operated

References

External links
 History of No.'s 541–598 Squadrons at RAF Web
 547 Squadron history on the official RAF website

Aircraft squadrons of the Royal Air Force in World War II
547
Military units and formations established in 1942